Brigadier Hector Eduardo Ruiz Airport is a public use airport located  east-northeast of Coronel Suárez, Buenos Aires, Argentina.

See also
List of airports in Argentina

References

External links 
 Airport record for Brigadier Hector Eduardo Ruiz Airport at Landings.com

Airports in Buenos Aires Province